Lembit Eelmäe (26 September 1927 Holdre Parish, Valga County – 2 July 2009 Tartu) was an Estonian actor.

1951 he graduated from Estonian State Theatre Institute. 1951-1957 he worked at Endla Theatre, and since 1957 at Vanemuine Theatre.

Since 1954 he married actress Herta Elviste. Their son is the actor Andrus Eelmäe.

In 2005 he was awarded with Order of the White Star, IV class.

Filmography

 1955 "Andruse õnn" (feature film: role?)
 1978 "Põrgupõhja uus Vanapagan" (feature film: role?)
 1987 "Näost näkku" (feature film: role?)

References

1927 births
2009 deaths
Estonian male stage actors
Estonian male film actors
Estonian male television actors
20th-century Estonian male actors
21st-century Estonian male actors
Recipients of the Order of the White Star, 4th Class
People from Tõrva Parish